The 38th America's Cup will be raced between two yachts, one representing the defending yacht club and the other representing the challenging yacht club. The defending yacht club will be the one whose yacht wins the 37th America's Cup. The challenging yacht club will either be the one which is first to issue a valid challenge to the defending club under the Deed of Gift of the America's Cup and becomes a sole challenger, or the one which wins a Challenger Series organised by the first valid challenger, which would be called the Challenger of Record.

History

Origins
The America's Cup is the oldest competition in international sport, and the fourth oldest continuous sporting trophy of any kind. The cup itself was manufactured in 1848 and first called the "RYS £100 Cup". It was first raced for on 22 August 1851 around the Isle of Wight off Southampton and Portsmouth in Hampshire, England, in a fleet race between the New York Yacht Club's America and 15 yachts of the Royal Yacht Squadron. The race was witnessed by Queen Victoria and the future Edward VII and won by America. This is considered to be the first America's Cup race.

On 8 July 1857, the surviving members of the America syndicate donated the cup to the New York Yacht Club via the Deed of Gift of the America's Cup filed with the New York Supreme Court. The deed is the primary instrument that governs the rules to make a valid challenge for the America's Cup and the rules of conduct of the races. It states that the cup "is donated upon the condition that it shall be preserved as a perpetual challenge Cup for friendly competition between foreign countries", outlines how a foreign yacht club can make a challenge to the holder of the cup and what happens if they do not agree on how the match should be conducted. The deed makes it "distinctly understood that the cup is to be the property of the club [that has most recently won a match for the cup], subject to the provisions of this deed, and not the property of the owner or owners of any vessel winning a match".

Summary of Previous Matches

As at 31 March 2021, a total of 36 cup matches had been held. The New York Yacht Club won the first 24 matches, around the Isle of Wight and then 13 times off New York City and then 11 times off Newport, Rhode Island, and established a 132-year winning record, the longest in international sport. Australia's Royal Perth Yacht Club broke this winning record on 26 September 1983 before losing the cup in 1987 in Fremantle, near Perth, in Western Australia. Since then, the cup has moved around more frequently, and has been won by the USA's San Diego Yacht Club (1987, 1988 and 1992), New Zealand's Royal New Zealand Yacht Squadron (1995, 2000, 2017 and 2021), Switzerland's Société Nautique de Genève (2003 and 2007), and the USA's Golden Gate Yacht Club (2010 and 2013).

Of the 36 cup matches prior to 31 March 2021, 33 were held in the home waters of the defending club. Because Switzerland is a land-locked country, and the deed envisages racing should be held on ocean courses, Société Nautique de Genève held its 2007 and 2010 defences in Valencia, Spain. For commercial reasons, Golden Gate Yacht Club held the 2017 defence in Bermuda, losing to the Royal New Zealand Yacht Squadron. When defending the cup in home waters, the defending cup has won 85% of America's Cup matches, losing only in 1851, 1983, 1987, 1992 and 2003. When defending the cup in foreign waters, the defending cup has lost 67% of America's Cup matches, losing in 2010 and 2017.

Decisions on the location and date of the 37th America's Cup will be made by 19 November 2021. The defender will be a yacht representing the Royal New Zealand Yacht Squadron and the challenger will either be a yacht representing the United Kingdom's Royal Yacht Squadron Racing Ltd or a yacht representing another non-New Zealand yacht club that wins a challenger series, such as the 2021 Prada Cup.

Based on recent experience, a challenge to the winner of the 37th America's Cup will likely be arranged for immediately after the completion of the match, setting the boundaries for the rules of the 38th America's Cup.

Rules for Issuing Challenge

All challenges for the America's Cup are made under the Deed of Gift of the America's Cup, which outlines who can challenge for the cup, and what information a challenger must provide to the defender. The deed then allows for most of the arrangements for the match to be made by negotiation and mutual consent, but provides a backstop in the event agreement is not reached. The first valid challenge that is made must be accepted by the defender or it must forfeit the cup to that valid challenger or negotiate other terms.

To be eligible, a challenging club must be "an organized yacht Club" of a country other than the defender, which is "incorporated, patented, or licensed by the legislature, admiralty or other executive department". The club must hold an "annual regatta [on] an ocean water course on the sea, or on an arm of the sea, or one which combines both". The New York Supreme Court and the New York Court of Appeals have held that this means the challenging club must in fact "have held at least one qualifying annual regatta before it submits its Notice of Challenge to a Defender and demonstrate that it will continue to have qualifying annual regattas on an ongoing basis" and not merely intend to hold its first annual regatta before the envisaged America's Cup match. The New York Supreme Court has also found that the Great Lakes between the United States and Canada are arms of the sea, allowing clubs with regattas on those lakes to be challengers.

The challenge document must give dates for the proposed races, which must be no less than 10 months from the date the challenge is made, and within date ranges specified for both the northern and southern hemispheres. The challenge document must also provide information on the yacht, including length on load water line; beam at load water line, and extreme beam; and draught of water. If the yacht has one mast, it must be between 44 and 90 feet on the load water line. If it has more than one mast, it must be between 80 and 115 feet on the load water line. These dimensions may not be exceeded by either challenger or defender. The yachts must be propelled by sails only and be constructed in the country to which the challenging and defending clubs belong. Centreboard or sliding keel vessels are allowed with no restrictions nor limitations, and neither the centre-board nor sliding keel is considered a part of the vessel for any purposes of measurement. As long as these rules are met, the New York Court of Appeals has ruled that defender may use a boat of a different category to the challenger, such as meeting a challenge in a monohull with a catamaran.

Under the deed, the defender and challenger "may by mutual consent make any arrangement satisfactory to both as to the dates, courses, number of trials, rules and sailing regulations, and any and all other conditions of the match, in which case also the ten months’ notice may be waived". Since 1958, the practice has usually been for the defender and challenger to agree that the challenger shall be a Challenger of Record, which then arranges a Challenger Series involving a number of other yacht clubs from countries other than that of the defender. The yacht that wins the Challenger Series wins the Herbert Pell Cup and also an associated sponsored cup such as the Prada Cup in 2021 or the Louis Vuitton Cup between 1983 and 2017. 
  
However, if the challenger and defender cannot agree, the deed provides a backstop, requiring a first-to-two match on ocean courses defined in the deed, at a venue selected by the defender, under its rules and sailing regulations so far as they do not conflict with the provisions of the deed, on the dates submitted by the challenger and in yachts meeting the terms of the deed and the challenge notice.

Planned Yacht Class

Royal Yacht Squadron Racing Ltd and Royal New Zealand Yacht Squadron agreed that the AC75 foiling monohull class developed and used for the first time for the 36th America's Cup shall remain the class of yacht for the 37th America's Cup. Royal Yacht Squadron Racing Ltd and Royal New Zealand Yacht Squadron also want the AC75 class to be used for the 38th America's Cup, and say that agreement to this will be a condition of entry for any other complying clubs wishing to enter any challenger series for the 37th America's Cup. Given the rules of the deed outlined above, executing this would require the winner of the 37th America's Cup to ensure the first challenge it received stipulated the use of the AC75 class.

References

External links 
 Americascup.com, the official website of the competition

 
America's Cup regattas
Amer